was a waka poet and Japanese noblewoman active in the Heian period.

A member of the Minamoto clan, her work is also included in the Kin'yō Wakashū.

In 1142, she ordained as a Buddhist nun.

Poetry 
One of her poems is included in the Ogura Hyakunin Isshu:

External links 
E-text of her poems in Japanese

Japanese poets
Japanese women poets
Minamoto clan
People of Heian-period Japan
Hyakunin Isshu poets
Heian period Buddhist nuns
Japanese nobility